David James Edwards (born 10 December 1934) is a Welsh former professional footballer who played as a wing half for Fulham.

References

1934 births
Living people
People from Treharris
Sportspeople from Merthyr Tydfil County Borough
Welsh footballers
Association football wing halves
Fulham F.C. players
Hakoah Sydney City East FC players